Wansuk Syiem (born 25 June 1956) is an Indian politician. She was a Member of Parliament, representing Meghalaya State in the Rajya Sabha (the upper house of India's Parliament) for the second term of 2014–2020.

Earlier she won the by-election unopposed on 11/04/2013 due to resignation of sitting member Thomas A.  Sangma on 04/02/2013.  She belongs to the Indian National Congress  political party.

References

1956 births
Living people
Rajya Sabha members from Meghalaya
People from Shillong
Women in Meghalaya politics
21st-century Indian women politicians
21st-century Indian politicians
Women members of the Rajya Sabha
Indian National Congress politicians from Meghalaya